The year 1823 in archaeology involved some significant events.

Excavations
 Roman tombs near Lorium, Etruria (1823–4).
 Roman villa near Bramdean, Hampshire, England.

Finds
 January - In a cave on the Gower Peninsula of south Wales, Rev. William Buckland discovers the "Red Lady of Paviland", the first identification of a prehistoric (male) human burial. The bones are discovered with those of the woolly mammoth, proving that the two had coexisted.
 Summer - Smythe's Megalith, a Neolithic tomb, is discovered in Kent, England, and excavated by local antiquarian Clement Smythe.
 Borough Hill Roman villa in the midlands of England is discovered by archaeologist, George Baker.
 The Caergwrle Bowl, a decorated Middle Bronze Age artefact, is discovered in north east Wales.
 The Ormside bowl, a gilded silver Anglo-Saxon double-bowl, dating from the mid-8th century, is found in Great Ormside, Cumbria.

Events
 Rev. Dr. Henry Duncan completes reconstruction of the Northumbrian Ruthwell Cross in Scotland.

Births
 June 7 - Giuseppe Fiorelli, Italian archaeologist of Pompeii (died 1896)
 November 17 - John Evans, English archaeologist (died 1908)

Deaths
 December 3 - Giovanni Battista Belzoni, Italian explorer of Egyptian antiquities (born 1778)

See also
Ancient Egypt / Egyptology

References

Archaeology
Archaeology by year
Archaeology
Archaeology